Ben 10: Alien Force – Vilgax Attacks is the third game in the Ben 10 video game series, and the second game to be based on the Ben 10: Alien Force series. The first game was based on the first two seasons of series; while Vilgax Attacks is based on the third and final season of the series. It was released on October 27, 2009.

Plot
The story starts as Vilgax invades earth with a gigantic Null Void projector. To help save the earth, Professor Paradox sends the trio Ben Tennyson, Gwen Tennyson, and Kevin Levin back in time in order to stop Vilgax from collecting a power source for his Null Void projector. With help from Grandpa Max and Ship, Ben and company travel throughout the galaxy to foil Vilgax's evil plan before it can come to fruition.

Gameplay
Gameplay consists of action and puzzle-solving that revolves around the skills of alien forms. For example, Ben might need to change into his Humungousaur form to break through doors, or use Swampfire to ignite flammable substances. Each form has different combinations and special attacks that it can execute, and Ben can unlock new abilities by defeating enemies and collecting glowing energy orbs. However, using a form's innate abilities drains energy from Ben's Omnitrix meter, preventing them from continually being used until the meter can recharge.

Reception

On the review aggregator Metacritic, it received "mixed or average" reviews.

References

External links

2009 video games
D3 Publisher games
Nintendo DS games
Xbox 360 games
PlayStation 2 games
PlayStation Portable games
Wii games
Video game sequels
Video games about time travel
Video games based on Ben 10
Video games developed in the United States
Video games set in the United States
Video games set on fictional planets
Ben 10
Superhero video games
Single-player video games
Cartoon Network video games
Papaya Studio games
1st Playable Productions games